John James Jones (November 13, 1824 – October 19, 1898) was an American politician and lawyer from the state of Georgia who served in the United States Congress. The John James Jones House is listed on the National Register of Historic Places.

Early years and education
Jones was born near Waynesboro in Burke County, Georgia, in 1824 to Seaborn Henry Jones (1798-1859) and Margaret Walker Jones. He attended Waynesboro Academy and graduated from Emory College in Oxford, Georgia, (current-day) Oxford College of Emory University in 1845. He studied law, gained admittance to the state bar in 1848 and became a practicing attorney in Waynesboro. Jones married Evaline Toombs (1829-1900) and had a son named Seaborn Henry Jones (1861-1921).

Political service
Jones was elected to the United States House of Representatives as a Democrat to represent Georgia's 8th congressional district in the 36th United States Congress; however, he withdrew before the end of his term and served from March 4, 1859, through January 23, 1861.

During the American Civil War, Jones was a lieutenant in the Confederate States Army.

Later years
After the war, Jones returned to the practice of law in Burke County, Georgia. He died in Waynesboro on October 19, 1898, and was buried in the Magnolia Cemetery.

References

External links
 Retrieved on 2009-04-21
 Photograph of home built by John James Jones, Waynesboro, Burke County, Georgia, ca. 1960-1979

1824 births
1898 deaths
People from Waynesboro, Georgia
American people of Welsh descent
Democratic Party members of the United States House of Representatives from Georgia (U.S. state)
Georgia (U.S. state) lawyers
Confederate States Army officers
American slave owners
19th-century American politicians
19th-century American lawyers
Emory College alumni